Powerlifting at the 2012 Summer Paralympics was held at ExCeL London from 30 August to 5 September, with a maximum of 200 athletes (120 men and 80 women), competing in 20 events. According to the classification rules of the International Federation for Powerlifting athletes which cannot participate in weightlifting events because of a physical impairment affecting their legs or hips are deemed eligible to compete in powerlifting events at the Paralympics.

Events
There were twenty powerlifting events, corresponding to ten weight classes each for men and women.

Participating nations
There were 114 male and 80 female competitors.

Medal summary

Medal table

Women's events

Men's events

References

 
2012 Summer Paralympics events
Paralympics